is a side-scrolling action game developed by Westone Bit Entertainment that was originally released for the arcades by Sega in 1988. It is the third game in the Wonder Boy series and the last one released for the arcade. A console adaptation was made by Hudson Soft, released in 1989 in Japan for the PC Engine CD-ROM² System and the subsequent North American release on the TurboGrafx-CD dropped the 'Wonder Boy III' title. It was also converted and released by Sega for the Mega Drive in Japan in 1990 and Europe in 1991. Both, the TurboGrafx-CD and Mega Drive versions have been re-released for the Wii Virtual Console.

Gameplay

The game balances basic concepts found in both platformers and arcade shooters. The player is able to jump and shoot projectiles from a sword. He must ride a flying dragon and confront a large boss throughout the second half of each round. The player's life bar steadily diminishes as time passes. Health is gained through collection of fruit and projectile weapons. Some fruits, when shot, will expand and burst into multiple items.

Combat
In the action scenes, the player's vitality decreases as he makes his way towards the skull, but this can be restored by collecting fruit. A wide variety of weapons can be picked up, and not only do these allow the player to use the weapons for a limited amount of time, but they also increase vitality. In the shooter scenes, the player rides a pink friend as he makes his way through the scene. Here, vitality remains static unless hit by an enemy passing by. As usual, there is a boss waiting at the end that must be defeated. Every boss changes color to show how much damage has been done to it. Some bosses must be defeated in two stages. If vitality gets low in each scene, the player loses a life. Two players can play the game simultaneously.

Plot and setting
The player controls a green-haired boy hero named Leo (player 1) or a pink-haired girl hero named Princess Purapril (Priscilla in the English language versions, player 2) who must attack the invaders that attempt to collect weapons and use them to destroy the land. The gameplay consists of action and shooter scenes. The game starts out as a simple platform game, and later on the game is transformed into a shoot 'em up.

Development
The game's music was composed by Shinichi Sakamoto, who is also responsible for the music of the game Wonder Boy in Monster Land.

Reception 
In Japan, Game Machine listed Wonder Boy III: Monster Lair on their December 15, 1988 issue as being the seventh most-successful table arcade unit of the month.

References

External links
Official Virtual Console page for the TurboGrafx-CD version
Official Virtual Console page for the Mega Drive version 
Wonder Boy III: Monster Lair (Arcade version) at arcade-history

1988 video games
Arcade video games
Cooperative video games
Sega Genesis games
TurboGrafx-CD games
Virtual Console games
Wonder Boy (video game series)
Side-scrolling platform games
Windows games
Video game sequels
Video games developed in Japan
Video games featuring female protagonists
Video games scored by Jun Chikuma
Multiplayer and single-player video games
Scrolling shooters
Run and gun games
Westone Bit Entertainment games